Live – Friday the 13th is a live DVD and CD release by Maroon 5. It was recorded on May 13, 2005 in Santa Barbara, California at the Santa Barbara Bowl.

The DVD features exclusive interviews with the band and insight into how certain key songs came about. The live concert is a performance of all their songs and the CD contains the same tracks.

This album has been released with the Copy Control protection system in some regions.

Track listing

Personnel 
Maroon 5
 Adam Levine – lead vocals, lead and rhythm guitar
 Jesse Carmichael – keyboards, backing vocals
 Mickey Madden – bass guitar
 James Valentine – lead and rhythm guitar
 Ryan Dusick – backing vocals 
 Matt Flynn – drums, percussion
Other
 Melinda Kelly - production

Charts

References

Maroon 5 live albums
2005 live albums
A&M Octone Records live albums
2005 video albums
A&M Octone Records video albums
Live video albums
Maroon 5 video albums
Friday the 13th